The 1991 Georgia Tech Yellow Jackets football team represented the Georgia Institute of Technology during the 1991 NCAA Division I-A football season. The Yellow Jackets were led by head coach Bobby Ross in his fifth and final year with the team, and played their home games at Bobby Dodd Stadium in Atlanta, Georgia. They competed as members of the Atlantic Coast Conference, finishing tied for second.

The defending national champions of the Coaches Poll, Georgia Tech finished with a disappointing five losses. They opened the year with a top-ten battle with Penn State in the Kickoff Classic, losing 22–34. Further losses to ACC foes Clemson and NC State knocked Georgia Tech out of the polls. They won 5 of their last 6, however, capped by a come-from-behind win over Stanford in the 1991 Aloha Bowl in Honolulu.

Schedule

Sources:

Roster

Game summaries

vs. Penn State

vs. Stanford (Aloha Bowl)

References

Georgia Tech
Georgia Tech Yellow Jackets football seasons
Aloha Bowl champion seasons
Georgia Tech Yellow Jackets football